The F. D. R. Project (also known as The For Da Record Project) is an album by Frank N Dank and hip hop producer, Young RJ. This album is included on Frank N Dank and J Dilla's European Vacation CD/DVD.

The first single of the album is "Puff Puff Pass". The song was dedicated to their longtime friend, J Dilla.

Track listing

References

External links
FRANK N DANK & J DILLA'S EUROPEAN VACATION
Frank-N-Dank Discography with streaming audio

2007 albums
Frank n Dank albums